Pedro Aznar (born 23 July 1959) is an Argentine musician and singer-songwriter. He has a musical experience in jazz, Argentine folk and rock music and has a successful career as a solo artist. He is well known for giving rock songs a jazz-oriented style, by playing the fretless bass, with a big influence from Jaco Pastorius.

He is a multi-instrumentalist and the author of several books of poetry published in Argentina. He plays an important part in Argentine rock, where in the mid-1970s, he had various appearances with groups like Madre Atómica, Alas and Pastoral. He became one of four members of Serú Girán in 1978, one of the most musically influential bands that dominated Argentina's rock circuit for the next four years. In 1982 he accepted an invitation from Pat Metheny to join The Pat Metheny Group as a vocalist, with whom he recorded three Grammy Award-winning albums.

Later he began his solo career, while also working scoring music to film soundtracks. His 1991 album Tango 4 with Charly García as a duo went platinum and was named best rock album of the year in Argentina by the Argentine Association of Entertainment Critics. In 1990, he worked as a producer in Sandra Mihanovich and Celeste Carballo's album Mujer contra mujer.

Discography

References

External links
Artist's website

1959 births
Singers from Buenos Aires
20th-century Argentine male singers
Argentine male singer-songwriters
Argentine multi-instrumentalists
Living people
Pat Metheny Group members
Berklee College of Music alumni
21st-century Argentine male singers